Pa Brayong (also known as Pa Bryong or Pa Berayong) is a settlement in the Lawas division of Sarawak, Malaysia.

Neighbouring settlements include:

References

Populated places in Sarawak